The men's decathlon competition at the 1994 European Athletics Championships in Helsinki, Finland, was held at Helsinki Olympic Stadium on 12 August and 13 August 1994.

Medalists

Schedule

12 August

13 August

Records

Results

Participation
According to an unofficial count, 28 athletes from 15 countries participated in the event.

 (1)
 (1)
 (3)
 (2)
 (3)
 (3)
 (2)
 (1)
 (1)
 (1)
 (3)
 (1)
 (3)
 (1)
 (2)

See also
 1993 Men's World Championships Decathlon
 1994 Hypo-Meeting
 1994 Decathlon Year Ranking
 1995 Men's World Championships Decathlon

References

External links
 Results
 Results
 todor66

Decathlon
Combined events at the European Athletics Championships